is a Japanese manga artist, who is the creator of Gantz, Gigant, Hen and Inuyashiki, the first two of which have been serialized in Weekly Young Jump. Originally influenced by Katsuhiro Otomo and Ryoichi Ikegami, his manga often contain explicit violence, sexual depictions, and matters that are considered taboo by the public, and he is known as a pioneer in the use of digital processing for manga backgrounds.

His debut manga Hen was a runner-up in the 1988 Young Jump Youth Manga Awards.

Oku designed a character for Namco Bandai's Xbox 360 and PlayStation 3 fighting game, Soulcalibur IV named Shura.

Works 
 Hen (1988–1997)
There are two series of Hen; the first, with kanji, ran for 13 volumes—the first three are short story collections, and the remaining ten are a romantic comedy in which both leads are male. The short stories were later repackaged as "Aka" and "Kuro".
The second series, 8 volumes, with the title only in romaji, is a romantic comedy in which both leads are women.  This series has been adapted into an anime.
 Zero One (1999–2000)
There are only three volumes, about a video game tournament. The series was cancelled abruptly due to poor sales figures and reception.
 Gantz (2000–2013)
It consists of 37 volumes. The first eight have been adapted into the first 21 episodes of the two seasons of the anime, with the final five episodes consisting of a different story that doesn't follow the manga.
 Maetel no Kimochi (2006–2007)
Three volumes in all, about a shut-in or hikikomori falling in love with his young stepmother after the death of his father.
 Inuyashiki (2014–2017)
A story about an aging and ill salaryman who is transformed into an unstoppable battle machine after aliens accidentally destroy his body.
Gantz:G (2015–2017)
A spin-off of Gantz with art by Keita Iizuka.
 Gigant (2017–2021)
Rei Yokoyamada, a high school boy who falls in love with Papiko, an adult video actress with big breasts who gains the power to become gigantic.
Gantz:E (2020–present)
A historical spin-off of Gantz with art by Jin Kagetsu.

References

External links 

1967 births
Living people
Japanese artists
Manga artists from Fukuoka Prefecture
People from Fukuoka